The Blackburn Cirrus Bombardier was a British four-cylinder inline aircraft engine, developed and built by the Blackburn Aircraft company in the mid-1950s. The engine featured fuel injection.

Variants
Cirrus Bombardier 203
Military version, 203 hp (151 kW).
Cirrus Bombardier 702
Civil version, 180 hp (134 kW).
Cirrus Bombardier 704
Helicopter engine

Applications
Auster AOP.9
Cierva W.14 Skeeter IIIB
Miles Messenger

Specifications (Cirrus Bombardier 203)

See also

References

Notes

Bibliography

Oldengine.org
 
 Lumsden, Alec. British Piston Engines and their Aircraft. Marlborough, Wiltshire: Airlife Publishing, 2003. .

External links
 "Cirrus Bombardier" a 1948 Flight article

Aircraft air-cooled inline piston engines
1950s aircraft piston engines
Blackburn aircraft engines
Inverted aircraft piston engines